New Hampshire elected its members August 26, 1822. New Hampshire law required a candidate to receive votes from a majority of voters for election, that is 1/12 of votes. Only five candidates received the requisite majority, and so a May 11, 1823 run-off election was held for the sixth seat.

See also 
 1822 and 1823 United States House of Representatives elections
 List of United States representatives from New Hampshire

1822
New Hampshire
New Hampshire
United States House of Representatives
United States House of Representatives